Oval is an unincorporated community in Ashe County, North Carolina, United States.

History
A post office called Oval was established in 1898, and remained in operation until 1953. The origin of the name "Oval" is obscure.

References

Unincorporated communities in Ashe County, North Carolina
Unincorporated communities in North Carolina